This is a list of Clerks Assistant of the House of Commons of Canada.

The current Clerks Assistant are:
 Marie-Andrée Lajoie (2003–present)
 Eric Janse (2005–present)
 André Gagnon (2005–present)Past Clerks Assistant are:

 Alfred Patrick 1867–1873
 Eugène Urgele Piché 1873–1879
 Sir John George Bourinot 1879–1880
 Jean Phillippe Leprohon 1880–1882
 François Fortunat Rouleau 1882–1897
 Jean-Baptiste René Laplante 1897–1916
 Arthur Beauchesne 1916–1924
 Thomas Munro Fraser 1925–1942
 Charles Walter Boyce 1942–1945
 Roy Theodore Graham 1945–1949
 J. T. Dun (Acting) 1949–1949
 Edward Russell Hopkins 1949–1952
 Thomas R. Montgomery 1952–1964
 Alistair Fraser 1966–1967
 J. Gordon Dubroy 1968–1974
 Marcel R. Pelletier 1969–1982
 C. Beverly Koester 1975–1979
 Robert Marleau 1983–1987
 Phillip Alan Charles Landry 1983–1996
 Mary Ann Griffith 1984–1987
 Camille Montpetit 1995–1997
 William C. Corbett 1997–1999
 Audrey Elizabeth O'Brien 1997–2000
 Marc Bosc 2000–2005
 André Gagnon (Acting) 2005–2005

References
 Officers and Officials of Parliament

Clerks assist
Lists of Canadian civil servants
House of Commons of Canada
Ceremonial officers in Canada